John Nicodemus Wilson (June 15, 1890 – September 23, 1954) was a professional baseball pitcher. He pitched in three games in Major League Baseball for the Washington Senators during its 1913 season.

External links

Major League Baseball pitchers
Washington Senators (1901–1960) players
Baseball players from Maryland
1890 births
1954 deaths